Norbert Holík (born 14 May 1972 in Žiar nad Hronom) is a Paralympian athlete from Slovakia who competes mainly in category P13 pentathlon events.

Biography
He competed in the 2000 Summer Paralympics in Sydney, Australia. There he won a bronze medal in the men's Pentathlon – P13 event. He also competed at the 2004 Summer Paralympics in Athens, Greece. There he finished sixth in the men's Pentathlon – P13 event. He also competed in alpine skiing at the 2002 Winter Paralympics, 2006 Winter Paralympics and 2010 Winter Paralympics. In Salt Lake City in 2002, Holík won a bronze medal in slalom.

References

External links
 

Paralympic athletes of Slovakia
Paralympic alpine skiers of Slovakia
Athletes (track and field) at the 2000 Summer Paralympics
Athletes (track and field) at the 2004 Summer Paralympics
Alpine skiers at the 2002 Winter Paralympics
Alpine skiers at the 2006 Winter Paralympics
Alpine skiers at the 2010 Winter Paralympics
Paralympic bronze medalists for Slovakia
Living people
1972 births
Medalists at the 2000 Summer Paralympics
Medalists at the 2002 Winter Paralympics
Slovak male alpine skiers
Paralympic medalists in athletics (track and field)
Sportspeople from Žiar nad Hronom